Produturi Akshath Reddy (born 11 February 1991, Hyderabad) is an Indian cricket player who plays for Hyderabad in the domestic cricket. He is a right-handed batsman.

Reddy made his debut against Rajasthan and was signed up by Deccan Chargers for 2012 Indian Premier League. He was part of the IPL 2013 season with the new owners of the Hyderabad franchise, the Sunrisers Hyderabad.

Reddy scored 359 runs at 51 from five matches in the Cooch Behar Trophy, and 316 runs from the same number of games in the Under-22 CK Nayudu Trophy in the 2008-09 season. He was named in the U-19 squad for the 2010 World Cup in New Zealand. Reddy was encouraged by his father, a former volleyball player, to take up sport seriously. Reddy's idol is India's great Rahul Dravid and compares his style of play to Australia's Michael Hussey.

In November 2018, in Hyderabad's match against Tamil Nadu in the 2018–19 Ranji Trophy, he scored his maiden double-century in first-class cricket. He was the leading run-scorer for Hyderabad in the tournament, with 797 runs in eight matches.

In August 2019, he was named in the India Green team's squad for the 2019–20 Duleep Trophy.

References

External links
Akashath Reddy at Cricinfo.

1991 births
Living people
Cricketers from Hyderabad, India
Indian cricketers
Hyderabad cricketers
South Zone cricketers
Sunrisers Hyderabad cricketers
Deccan Chargers cricketers
India Blue cricketers